Munduz is a village in the Issyk-Kul Region of Kyrgyzstan. It is part of the Jeti-Ögüz District. Its population was 707 in 2021.

Population

References

Populated places in Issyk-Kul Region